Pygodasis is a New World genus of wasps in the family Scoliidae (scoliid wasps).

Species
Species within this genus include:

Pygodasis bistrimaculata (Lepeletier, 1845)
Pygodasis cineraria (Sichel, 1864)
Pygodasis columbiensis (Bradley, 1945)
Pygodasis cristata (Bradley, 1945)
Pygodasis ephippium (Say, 1837) – saddleback scoliid wasp
Pygodasis hyalina (de Saussure, 1864)
Pygodasis ianthina (Bradley, 1945)
Pygodasis lucasi (de Saussure, 1858)
Pygodasis quadrimaculata (Fabricus, 1775) – large four-spotted scoliid wasp
Pygodasis spegazzini (Bréthes, 1910)
Pygodasis terrestris (de Saussure, 1858)
Pygodasis veroninae (Schrottky, 1910)
Pygodasis vespiformis (de Saussure, 1858)
Pygodasis vittata (Sichel, 1864)

References

Scoliidae
Hymenoptera genera
Parasitic wasps